Romik is both a surname and a given name. Notable people with the name include:

 Romik Khachatryan (born 1978), Armenian footballer
 Stanisław Romik (1926–2016), Polish sports shooter

See also
 Romig